Yemo Airport  is an airstrip serving the village of Yemo in Tshuapa Province, Democratic Republic of the Congo.  The narrow runway also serves as a road within the village, and tapers off to a trail at the southern end.

See also

Transport in Democratic Republic of the Congo
List of airports in the Democratic Republic of the Congo

References

External links
OpenStreetMap - Yemo
 HERE Maps - Yemo
 OurAirports - Yemo
 FallingRain - Yemo Airport

Airports in Tshuapa Province